The Ciarraige were a population-group recorded in the early historic era in Ireland.

Origins 
The word Ciarraige means the people of Ciar. Ciar was the illegitimate son of Fergus, the King of Ulster. After being banished from the Court of Cruachan, Ciar sought refuge in Munster. There he gained the territory for the first branch of Ciarraige, which he called Ciarraige Luachra.

Branches 
The Cíarraige were a people found scattered over much of Ireland. Known branches were:

 Ciarraige Luachra, who gave their name to County Kerry
 Ciarraige Altraige, Mocu Alti, or Altai; living around Tralee, northwest of county Kerry.
 Ciarraige Cuirche, located in the barony of Kerrycurrihy, south of Cork city
 Ciarraige Diurgi, located somewhere in Munster
 Ciarraige Irluachra, located close to the Ciarraige Luchra in western Sliabh Luachra
 Ciarraige Sleibe Cua, in what is now County Waterford
 Ciarraige Muman, situated in Munster
 Ciarraige Choinchenn, location uncertain
 Ciarraige Conmed, location uncertain
 Ciarraige Maige Glas, northeast part of Maigh Ai in Moylurg, north County Roscommon.
 Ciarraige Des Cechair, location uncertain (possibly in Tethba, now in County Longford)
 Ciarraige Oic Bethra, of Aidhne, now south County Galway
 Ciarraige Aí, based on the plain of Magh nAi in County Roscommon
 Ciarraige Airtech, an obscure branch of the above, around Tibohine, County Roscommon
 Ciarraige Loch Airned, based around Loch Airned, now Mannin Lake, County Mayo, close to the Roscommon border.

Notable people 

 St Brendan the Navigator

See also 

 Conmhaícne

References

Notes

Sources
 
 
 
 
 
 
 
 

Historical Celtic peoples
Tribes of ancient Ireland
Gaelic-Irish nations and dynasties
Ulaid